WKBQ (93.5 FM) is a country music radio station in Covington, Tennessee, and serving the Memphis, Tennessee area, owned by Charles Ennis through licensee Grace Broadcasting Services, Inc.

History
WKBQ first signed on the air as WKBL-FM in 1965 with a country music format until 1999 when it switched to an adult top 40 format and adopted the WKBQ call sign. In 2007, it returned to country.

The WKBQ call sign was previously used for many years by a top 40 radio station serving the St. Louis Missouri/Illinois market. That station is now licensed as WARH.

External links
us51country facebook

KBQ